Shell Lake is a village in the Canadian province of Saskatchewan within the Rural Municipality of Spiritwood No. 496 and Census Division No. 16. This village is 90 kilometres west of the City of Prince Albert. It was formerly part of the Rural Municipality (RM) of Shell Lake No. 495 before it was absorbed by the RM of Spiritwood No. 496. It is the administrative centre of the Ahtahkakoop Cree First Nation band government.

History 
Shell Lake incorporated as a village on October 18, 1940.

The Shell Lake murders took place on a nearby farm in 1967.

Demographics 

Memorial Lake Regional Park 
Memorial Lake Regional Park is a regional park adjacent to the village of Shell Lake on the western shore of Memorial Lake in the RM of Spiritwood No. 496. Located at the intersection of Highways 3 and 12, the 300-acre park was established in 1962. Amenities at the park include camping, swimming, boating, ball diamonds, golfing, picnicking, and hiking.

There's a beach, dock, boat launch, marina, and fish filleting station. Northern pike are commonly found in the lake. The campground has 144 electrified campsites situated among pine and poplar trees with access to potable water, washrooms and showers, and a sewer dump. In the park, there are 59 privately owned cabins. Near the entrance to the park there's an 18-hole minigolf with a concession that serves soft ice cream and beverages. On a hill in the park, there is a stone monument built by local boy scouts in 1929. The stones used were gathered from the homesteads of local men who died in World War I.

The Memorial Lake Regional Golf Course is an 18-hole, grass greens course that is a par 71 with 6,002 total yards. There is a pro shop with club and cart rentals and a licensed clubhouse that has an appetizer menu.

See also 
 List of communities in Saskatchewan

References 

Villages in Saskatchewan
Spiritwood No. 496, Saskatchewan
Division No. 16, Saskatchewan